Qiongshan District, alternately romanized as Kiungshan, is one district in Haikou City, Hainan.

History
As Qiongzhou, formerly romanized as Kiungchow, the district was formerly a separate city which served as the center of Chinese administration on Hainan Island when it formed a part of Guangdong Province.

The British Consulate in Kiungchow was opened in April 1876, as a result of the Treaty of Tientsin in 1858.

Geography
It includes six rivers, an irregular coastline, and a number of bays and tidewater gullies. The mangrove forest on the south coast provides a habitat for birds and other wildlife.

Demographics
Mandarin is the official language of administration and education, but locals also speak Haikou dialect of Hainanese (a Min language), while other ethnic groups also speak the Qiongshan dialect of Lingao.

See also
 Qiongzhou Strait

Notes

References

External links
 Information about Qiongshan

Haikou
County-level divisions of Hainan